The Miss Universo Italia 2007 pageant was held on April 21, 2007. The chosen winner represented Italy at the Miss Universe 2007.

Results
Miss Universo Italia 2007 : Valentina Massi

External links
 http://missuniverse.notizie.alice.it/index.html?pmk=notmuinav

Miss Universo Italia
2007 beauty pageants
2007 in Italy